Pietro Pisani (1871–1960) was a Catholic archbishop and diplomat of the Holy See.

Biography
Pisani was born in Vercelli in Italy on 15 July 1871. He was appointed Apostolic Delegate to India and Titular Archbishop of Constantia in Scythia on 15 December 1919. On 21 December 1919, he was ordained a bishop by Cardinal Willem Marinus van Rossum, while the co-consecrators were Archbishop Giovanni Gamberoni, Archbishop of Vercelli and Bishop Giacomo Sinibaldi, Titular Bishop of Tiberias. He resigned as Apostolic Delegate in October 1924 and died on 16 February 1960.

External links
 catholic-hierarchy.org

1871 births
1960 deaths
People from Vercelli
Apostolic Nuncios to India